The 2011 Siemens Open was a professional tennis tournament played on clay courts. It was part of the Tretorn SERIE+ of the 2011 ATP Challenger Tour. It was the 19th edition of the tournament. It took place in Scheveningen, Netherlands between July 4 and July 10, 2011.

ATP entrants

Seeds

 1 Rankings are as of June 20, 2011.

Other entrants
The following players received wildcards into the singles main draw:
  Stephan Fransen
  Ivo Minář
  Antal van der Duim
  Nick van der Meer

The following players received entry from the qualifying draw:
  Colin Ebelthite
  Pierre-Hugues Herbert
  Juho Paukku
  Mathieu Rodrigues

Champions

Singles

 Steve Darcis def.  Marsel İlhan, 6–3, 4–6, 6–2

Doubles

 Colin Ebelthite /  Adam Feeney def.  Rameez Junaid /  Sadik Kadir, 6–4, 6–7(5–7), [10–7]

External links
Official Website
ITF Search 
ATP official site

The Hague Open
Clay court tennis tournaments
The Hague Open
2011 in Dutch tennis